D.A.V. Centenary Public School, Mandi is a private school located in the Himalayas in the town of Mandi. The school was established in 1985 by former principal Mr. Ashok Mangal Kumar.

It now has classes from nursery to 12th class. The school is affiliated to CBSE. The school hosts extracurricular activities along with studies. It is managed by the D.A.V. College Managing Committee, New Delhi.
The school has four branches in the city. Class 3-9 are divided into four sections housing  43 students on an average. The school has smart classes and computer labs for interactive learning. The school holds Annual Day Function in the month of December or November every year.

The school timing is from 9:15 in the morning to 3:15 in the noon for class 1–12.

Facilities and activities
 Library
 IT Lab
 Canteen
 Smart Class
 Playground
 Physics Laboratory
 Chemistry Laboratory
 Biology Laboratory
 Indoor games
 NCC
 Scouts and Guides

References 

Private schools in Himachal Pradesh
Mandi, Himachal Pradesh
Schools affiliated with the Arya Samaj
Schools in Mandi district